Ngwel  is an uninhabited island in Torba Province of Vanuatu in the Pacific Ocean. The island is a part of the Torres Islands archipelago.

Geography
Ngwel is located 600 meters off the west coast of Tegua. It is 500 m long and 200 m wide. The estimated terrain elevation above the sea level is some 9 metres.

Name
The form Ngwel reflects the island's name in Lo-Toga, N̄wēl . In neighbouring Hiw, it is known as N̄wëy .

References

Torba Province
Islands of Vanuatu
Archipelagoes of the Pacific Ocean